Emoia caeruleocauda, commonly known as the Pacific bluetail skink or Pacific blue-tail skink, is a species of lizard in the family Scincidae. It is widespread in the Indo-West Pacific.

Geographic range
E. caeruleocauda is found widespread from eastern Indonesia (from Sulawesi to east and south) through southern Philippines and New Guinea (Western New Guinea and Papua New Guinea) and the Solomon Islands northward into the Marianas, Carolines, and Marshall Islands, Micronesia, Fiji Islands, Vanuatu, and Guam. It has been reported from Borneo but the IUCN considers this doubtful.

Habitat
Emoia caeruleocauda is essentially terrestrial but it can ascend to forage in low scrub and climb a little distance up tree trunks.

References

Further reading
. 2006. A Photographic Guide to Snakes and Other Reptiles of Borneo. Sanibel Island, Florida: Ralph Curtis Books. 144 pp. . (Emoia caeruleocauda, p. 110).
De Vis CW. 1892. Zoology of British New Guinea. Part 1. Vertebrata. Annals of the Queensland Museum 2: 1–24. (Mocoa caeruleocauda, new species).

Emoia
Skinks of New Guinea
Fauna of the Federated States of Micronesia
Reptiles of Fiji
Reptiles of Indonesia
Fauna of the Mariana Islands
Reptiles of Palau
Reptiles of Papua New Guinea
Reptiles of the Philippines
Reptiles of the Solomon Islands
Reptiles of Vanuatu
Reptiles described in 1892
Taxa named by Charles Walter De Vis